Richard H. Smith (born March 9, 1945) is an American politician. He is a Republican representing District 134 in the Georgia House of Representatives.

Political career 

Smith was a City Counselor in Columbus, Georgia from 1997 to 2002.

Smith was elected to represent the 134th district in the Georgia House of Representatives in 2004. He has been re-elected without opposition since then, but in 2020 will face Democrat Carl Sprayberry in the general election.

Smith currently sits on the following committees:
 Appropriations
 Insurance
 Legislative & Congressional Reapportionment
 Natural Resources & Environment
 Rules (Chairman)
 Special Committee on Access to Quality Health Care

References 

1945 births
Living people
People from Columbus, Georgia
People from Johnson County, Georgia
Louisiana State University alumni
University of Florida alumni
Georgia (U.S. state) city council members
Republican Party members of the Georgia House of Representatives
21st-century American politicians